The Fourth Companion (Četvrti suputnik) is a Croatian film directed by Branko Bauer. It was released in 1967. The film is a continuation in spirit of Bauer's previous film Face to Face.

Plot 
New party committee secretary, Ivan (Mihailo Kostić), throws a wrench in city power broker Niko's (Ilija Džuvalekovski) plan to manipulate local factory workers into paying for the construction of a new sports centre. Meanwhile, Niko is having an affair with a young female professor (Renata Freishorn).

References

External links 
 

1967 films
1960s Croatian-language films
Films directed by Branko Bauer
Croatian drama films
1967 drama films
Yugoslav drama films